is a village located on  in the Dōzen group of islands in the Oki District, Shimane Prefecture, Japan. Chibu is the only village remaining in Shimane Prefecture as of October 1, 2005. As of Japan's 2010 census, the village has a population of 657 people, constituting 326 households, and a population density of about 48 persons per km². This is a decrease of 68 people (9.4%) from the previous census conducted in 2005. A population estimate from March 2011 placed Chibu's population at 656 people, 334 men and 322 women.

Geography
The Dōzen islands were formed from a single ancient volcanic island. The caldera of the volcano collapsed, leaving three main islands in a ring formation.

Climate
Located on an island located in the Sea of Japan, Chibu is within the Sea of Japan climate zone. Summer temperatures, though usually mild, are exacerbated by high humidity. Winter temperatures are also generally mild, though exacerbated by strong wind. The surrounding ocean has a warming effect, making winters milder than the mainland. Consequently, there is very little snow in Chibu, and what snow does fall usually melts quickly.

The nearest weather station is located in Ama on the nearby island of Nakanoshima. Chibu's average annual high and low temperatures are 17.6 °C (64 °F) and 10.5 °C (51 °F), with yearly mean of 14.4 °C (58 °F). The record high and low temperatures are 34.9 °C (95 °F) and -2.9 °C (27 °F) respectively. The average yearly humidity is 76%. Chibu receives an average of 1,662 mm (65.43 in) of precipitation a year.

History
The village is served by a sea port located in Kurii which provides ship transportation among the three islands of the Dozen group, to Okinoshima, and to the mainland. There is also a heliport for medical emergencies.

Culture

Festivals and events

is a festival held bi-annually, usually at the end of July. This festival is common throughout Japan, and the main event is carrying a mikoshi through the town. The home temple for this is Chibu's . Another common event during this festival is kodomo kabuki, or children's kabuki. Chibu's tradition has it that there was once a serious sickness on Chibu, and, after it passed, dances and kabuki were performed by children in celebration.

is a festival that was celebrated commonly across Japan in the past, but is recently becoming rarer. In the past, a famous monk named Kōbō-Daishi traveled throughout Japan and founded many temples. The festival started as a way for people to "copy" him by visiting various small temples in their town. Usually food is available at each location for visitors. The food is made by married women who often start preparing the food early in the morning. In Chibu, this festival is usually held in April.

is an event that, like Odaishi-san mawari, was more common in the past, but is less common now. A rope (or “snake”) is braided from dried rice-straw, and wrapped around a tree. This for good luck in the year's harvest, and usually is done in the fall.

is a festival held in April for a beef-cattle show and to kick off the tourist season. Typical events in the festival are a cow show, karaoke contest, performances by elementary and kindergarten children, local folk songs called , and occasionally hired music talent. Festival food is also sold such as Oki beef, oysters, and yakisoba .

is a small traditional festival not unique to Chibu held in October for good luck in the harvest and safety for marine vessels. Drums are played and a dance is performed to send luck to the town.

 and 
are common events throughout Japan usually held in November and October, respectively. In many other places, towns and schools may hold their own separate events. However, in Chibu the village and school combine because of the small population.

In popular culture

 In April 1982 a  washed up on Chibu, and was identified by a professor of zoology from Kyoto University. It was 6.8m long and 1.7m wide, with a "neck-like thing" 1.5m long. People named it  after Nessy, and called the event the 
In 2008, Chibu was featured in an NHK television drama called .

See also
 List of fishing villages

References

External links

Chibu Tourism Association 
Chibu Middle School 
Google Map of community services and locations on Chibu

Villages in Shimane Prefecture
Fishing communities